Mark Thomas Little (born October 21, 1983) is a Canadian actor, comedian, writer, and producer. He is best known for his appearances on the CBC Television sitcom Mr. D, playing Simon Hunt, the Xavier Academy science teacher, and his work with Picnicface.

Personal
Little grew up in New Westminster, British Columbia, and lived in Vancouver, British Columbia and Halifax, Nova Scotia, before moving to Toronto, Ontario, where he currently resides.

Career

Comedy
Little is the former Humour Editor of Simon Fraser University's The Peak (newspaper). He has performed at Yuk Yuk's, the Halifax Comedy Festival, and CBC Radio's "So You Think You're Funny" series. He is a member of the Halifax-based sketch comedy group Picnicface. The troupe has produced several successful viral videos, is featured on Funny or Die, and stars in the films, Roller Town and Room for Rent.

Little is also co-star of CTV's Space Riders: Division Earth, a Power Rangers-themed web series that released its first season in 2014. The show won the 2015 Canadian Canadian Screen Award for best original webseries, and is set to release a second season in 2016.

Television
Since 2012, Little has portrayed Xavier Academy Science teacher Simon Hunt on the CBC Television sitcom Mr. D.

Voice acting
Little's voice is featured in the YouTube video for an energy beverage called "Powerthirst" which holds over 32 million views and is part of an internet meme known as "Extreme Advertising". Little was subsequently hired to voice a drink ad inspired by the film Idiocracy called "Brawndo: The Thirst Mutilator". Little currently stars as the title role in the VRV animated series Gary and His Demons. He is the voice of Dino in the Netflix series Cupcake & Dino: General Services and voiced Dave the mall guard Transformers: BotBots (TV series). He is also the writer of most of the series' episodes.

Honours and awards
In 2019, Little won the Canadian Comedy Award for Best Performance in a Feature Film for Room for Rent.  In 2008, Little was named Best Comedian by the readers of Halifax's The Coast, and appeared on the cover of the November 6, 2008, edition. Little also beat out 63 comics to win first place and $25,000 in Yuk Yuk's 2009 Great Canadian Laugh Off, a nationwide comedy competition.

Praise 
Mark Little has been called a "budding Canadian treasure" by Funny Business and described as "one of the best comic storytellers around" by NOW Magazine Toronto.

References

External links
 .

Living people
Canadian stand-up comedians
Canadian male television actors
Canadian television personalities
Canadian male voice actors
Canadian male film actors
Comedians from British Columbia
Male actors from British Columbia
People from New Westminster
Canadian male comedians
Canadian sketch comedians
1983 births
Canadian Comedy Award winners